Mmeya is a village in Central District of Botswana. It is located 60 km west of Francistown. The village has a primary school and the population was 556 in 2001 census.

References

Populated places in Central District (Botswana)
Villages in Botswana